Trimerelysin II (Trimeresurus metalloendopeptidase II, proteinase H2, H2-proteinase) is an enzyme. This enzyme catalyses the following chemical reaction

 Cleavage of Asn3-Gln, His10-Leu and Ala14-Leu in the insulin B chain, and the bond Z-Gly-Pro-Leu-Gly-Pro in a small molecule substrate of microbial collagenase

This endopeptidase is present in the venom of the habu snake (Trimeresurus flavoviridis).

References

External links 
 

EC 3.4.24